Sacred Promise is a 2019 Thai television series that originally aired on Channel 3 from August 1 to September 11, 2019 for 12 episodes. The lakorn starring Yuke Songpaisan and Diana Flipo was adapted from a novel by Salaya Sukanivatt. The series, alternating between modern-day Bangkok and 19th-century Siam, tells the story of star-crossed lovers reunited in modern times by reincarnation. The historic part of the drama covers about 20 years during the reign and death of King Rama IV (Mongkut), and the reign of his son King Rama V (Chulalongkorn), who abolished slavery in Siam.

Synopsis
Pakin (Yuke Songpaisan) is the son of a wealthy family. From early on, he is tormented by reoccurring nightmares of being executed by sword. After having been sent abroad to escape this nightmare, he returns  from his studies to his family in Bangkok, only to find the nightmares resuming. While his parents reject them as bare dreams which he should just forget about, his grandmother supports him. Together, they consult a monk who concludes that Pakin appears to remember a past reincarnation.
One day Pakin encounters Rosawan (Diana Flipo) who looks like a woman from this past. Moreover, when he accompanies his grandmother on a visit to an old wooden mansion she is interested in buying, Pakin recognises the building which leads to him experiencing vivid flash-backs from his past life.
From then on his dreams turn into a consecutive retelling of the story of Tod (Yuke Songpaisan), his past alter ego . At the age of eight, Tod was sold by his impoverished mother to the wealthy Phra Wasu Pinit, the past owner of the old mansion. Tod  grows up as a slave and servant to Phra Wasu Pinit’s son, Khun Nop, while falling in love with his master’s daughter and Khun Nop’s sister, Khun Nim (Diana Flipo).

Pakin watches Tods story unfolding in his dreams, keen to find out why he was executed in the past. Meanwhile, he attempts to get closer to Rosawan hoping that she is indeed the reincarnation of his past love Khun Nim. However, his overbearing ways of initiating contact with her irritate Rosawan and intensify her hatred of him she cannot explain herself. Pakin suspects it may be linked to his past life and his execution. So he has to follow Tods story through to find out, if Rosawan and he can overcome their differences from the past and be reunited in the present.

Cast

Main
 Yuke Songpaisan as Pakin / Tod
 Diana Flipo as Rosawan / Khun Nim

Supporting

Recent and past times
 Lita Kaliya Niehuns as Naweeya / Noi
 Kiatkamol Lata as Thanwa / Chit
 Siraloet Ratchani as Pakinee, Pakin’s mother / Cheun, Tod’s mother

Recent time
 Sorawit Suboon as Sahat, Pakin’s friend
 Jeab Paweena Charivsakul as Chaba, Rosawan’s mother
 Narumol Nilawan as Rosawan’s aunt
 Wichai Jongprasitporn as Termsak

Past time
 Go Gosin Rachakrom as Khun Nop, Khun Nim’s brother
 Pu Moniere Jenuksorn as Phra Wasu Pinit, the father of Khun Nop and Khun Nim
 Narumon Phongsupan as Khun Nom, the mother of Khun Nop and Khun Nim
 Tao Sarocha Watitapun as Bai, Noi’s mother
 Donat Natchaya Mungnimit as Yam
 Noi Nuttanee Sittisamarn as Pit
 Watcharachai Soonthornsiri as Chod
 Suchao Pongwilai as Grandfather Som
 Thitima Sangkhaphithak as Sadet Phra Ong Ying
 Pisamai Wilaisak as Ubon
 Wayne Falconer as Tod’s father

References

External links
 Sataya Tis Tarn on Youtube (in Thai, no subtitles)

Thai television soap operas
2010s Thai television series
Channel 3 (Thailand) original programming
Television series by Broadcast Thai Television